This is a list of football clubs in the United Arab Emirates. Currently there are officially 49 football clubs in the United Arab Emirates. Fourteen of them compete in the top tier division, 15 of them compete in the 2nd tier division, 12 of compete in the 3rd tier division and 8 of them are currently in a hiatus. There are four defunct clubs which means there is a total of 53 clubs in the history of UAE football.

Dubai

Abu Dhabi

Sharjah

Fujairah

Ras al Khaimah

Ajman

Umm al Quwain

Defunct Clubs

External links

United Arab Emirates
 
Lists of organisations based in the United Arab Emirates
Clubs